Sphingomonas lacus  is a Gram-negative, aerobic and motile bacteria from the genus of Sphingomonas which has been isolated from soil near a pond in Daejeon in Korea. Sphingomonas lacus produces  astaxanthin-dideoxyglycoside.

References

Further reading 
 

lacus
Bacteria described in 2015